This article lists events that occurred during 1925 in Estonia.

Incumbents

Events
First electric tram begins operating on Narva Road in Tallinn.
Estonian Chamber of Commerce and Industry founded.

Births

Deaths

References

 
1920s in Estonia
Estonia
Estonia
Years of the 20th century in Estonia